Iulia Mashinskaya is a Russian chess player who holds the titles of International Master (obtained in February 2005) and Woman Grandmaster.  

In January and April 2005, when her rating peaked at 2420, she was ranked 34th in the world for women chess players.

In 2019, Dmitry Kryakvin, writing for the Chess Federation of Russia about the history of chess in Tatarstan, named Mashinskaya as one of Kazan's most successful women players.

References

External links 

1977 births
Living people
Chess International Masters
Chess woman grandmasters